Peyia Stadium is a multi-purpose stadium in Peyia, Cyprus.  It is currently used mostly for football matches and was the home ground of APOP Kinyras Peyias FC. Since 2014 the stadium is the home ground of Peyia 2014. The stadium holds 3,828 people and the municipality of Peyia expects to extend the stands so the capacity will reach the 7.500 people.

Football venues in Cyprus
Multi-purpose stadiums in Cyprus
Buildings and structures in Paphos District